Magistrelli is an Italian surname. Notable people with the surname include:

Luciano Magistrelli (1938–2011), Italian footballer and manager
Sergio Magistrelli (born 1951), Italian footballer

Italian-language surnames